Dropull i Poshtëm (Kato Dropoli) is a former municipality in the Gjirokastër County, southern Albania. At the 2015 local government reform it became a subdivision of the municipality Dropull. The population at the 2011 census was 2,100. The municipal unit is inhabited by ethnic Greeks.

Settlements 

Derviçan (Δερβιτσάνη)
Dhuvjan (Δούβιανη)
Frashtan (Φράστανη)
Glinë (Γλύνα)
Goranxi (Καλογοραντζή or Γοραντζή)
Goricë (Γορίτσα)
Grapsh (Γράψη)
Haskovë (Χάσκοβο)
Lugar (Λιούγκαρη)
Peshkëpi e Sipërme (Άνω Επισκοπή)
Peshkëpi e Poshtme (Κάτω Επισκοπή)
Radë (Ραντάτι)
 (Σωφράτικα)
Terihat (Τεριαχάτι or Τεριαχάτες)
Vanistër (Βάνιστα)
Vrahogoranxi (Βραχογοραντζή)

Notable people 
Vasilios Sahinis (1897–1943), leader of the Northern Epirote resistance (1942–1943).

See also
 Dropull
 Dropull i Sipërm
 Greeks in Albania

References 

Administrative units of Dropull
Former municipalities in Gjirokastër County
Greek communities in Albania